The Hidden Bankroll is a 1913 short comedy silent film produced by the Lubin Manufacturing Company. The film was released in split-reel with another Lubin film When Mary Married.

The film is preserved in the Library of Congress collection.

References

External links
The Hidden Bankroll at IMDb.com

1913 films
American silent short films
Lubin Manufacturing Company films
American black-and-white films
1913 short films
1913 comedy films
American comedy short films
Silent American comedy films
1910s American films